Patrick Schliwa (born 8 April 1985) is a German international rugby union player, playing for the Heidelberger RK in the Rugby-Bundesliga and the German national rugby union team.

Schliwa played in the 2009, 2010, 2011 and 2012 German championship final for Heidelberger RK, losing the first one and winning the following three. Schliwa scored a try in the lost 2009 final, the only one for HRK in the game.

He made his debut for Germany in a friendly against Hong Kong on 12 December 2009.

Honours

Club
 German rugby union championship
 Champions: 2010, 2011, 2012
 Runners up: 2009
 German rugby union cup
 Winners: 2011

Stats
Patrick Schliwa's personal statistics in club and international rugby:

Club

 As of 11 May 2012

National team

European Nations Cup

Friendlies & other competitions

 As of 8 April 2012

References

External links
 Patrick Schliwa at scrum.com
  Patrick Schliwa at totalrugby.de
  Patrick Schliwa at the DRV website

1985 births
Living people
German rugby union players
Germany international rugby union players
Heidelberger RK players
Rugby union props